Hellmut Stauch (13 March 1910 – 19 July 1970) was a South African sailor. He competed at the 1952 Summer Olympics and the 1960 Summer Olympics.

References

External links
 

1910 births
1970 deaths
South African male sailors (sport)
Olympic sailors of South Africa
Sailors at the 1952 Summer Olympics – Finn
Sailors at the 1960 Summer Olympics – Flying Dutchman
People from Eisenach